Normal People is a 2018 novel by the Irish author Sally Rooney. Normal People is Rooney's second novel, published after Conversations with Friends (2017). It was first published by Faber & Faber on 30 August 2018. The book became a best-seller in the US, selling almost 64,000 copies in hardcover in its first four months of release. A critically acclaimed and Emmy nominated television adaptation of the same name aired from April 2020 on BBC Three and Hulu. A number of publications ranked it one of the best books of the 2010s.

Synopsis
The novel follows the complex friendship and relationship between two teenagers, Connell and Marianne, who both attend the same secondary school in County Sligo, Ireland, and, later, Trinity College Dublin (TCD). It is set during the post-2008 Irish economic downturn, from 2011 through 2015. Connell is a popular, handsome, and highly intelligent secondary school student who begins a relationship with the unpopular, intimidating, equally intelligent Marianne, whose mother employs Connell's mother as a cleaner. Connell keeps the affair a secret from school friends out of shame, but ends up attending Trinity with Marianne after the summer and reconciling. Well-off Marianne blossoms at university, becoming pretty and popular, while Connell struggles for the first time in his life to fit in properly with his peers. Marianne begins a relationship with Jamie, a boy who likes sadomasochism. Meanwhile Connell also begins a relationship with Helen, a pleasant girl who, however, is not up to Marianne. During the summer Connell travels around Europe with friends and visits Marianne while on holiday in Trieste with Jamie. While staying in the countryside, Marianne breaks up with Jamie and finds solace with Connell. Marianne spent the following university year in Sweden on the Erasmus programme, where she meets another abusive and violent man, the Swedish artist Lukas. Like Jamie, Lukas would like Marianne to be submissive and lend herself to any of his sexual fantasies. Meanwhile in Dublin Connell is deeply depressed by the suicide of his dear friend Rob.
When Marianne and Connell return to Sligo after graduation, they get back together but when Marianne asks him to hit her just for fun, Connell refuses. Humiliated, Marianne returns home, where her abusive brother Alan breaks her nose. Connell rushes to help her and threatens to kill Alan if he hurts her again. When things seem to settle down between the two, Connell receives a scholarship for a MFA in creative writing in New York, which would allow him to further his literary ambitions. Marianne encourages him to leave without her, even though it could end their relationship.

Reception
Normal People received wide critical acclaim. It was longlisted for the 2018 Man Booker Prize. It was voted as the 2018 Waterstones' Book of the Year and won "Best Novel" at the 2018 Costa Book Awards. In 2019, the novel was longlisted for the Women's Prize for Fiction. In the same year, it was ranked 25th on The Guardians list of the 100 best books of the 21st century. 

Irish Independent editor Fionnán Sheahan described the book as a polemic, noting that Rooney has described herself as a Marxist and that the book features discussions about The Communist Manifesto document and Doris Lessing's feminist novel The Golden Notebook.

Entertainment Weekly writers ranked the book as the 10th best of the decade, with Seija Rankin writing, "Both of Sally Rooney’s novels capture the millennial ethos with raw honesty and impeccable insight. But what she broke ground with in Conversations With Friends, she perfected in Normal People."

Awards

Adaptation

In May 2019, BBC Three and Hulu announced that a TV series based on the novel was set to be produced. It premiered on 26 April 2020 on BBC Three and 27 April 2020 on the Australian streaming service Stan. In Ireland, the series began airing on RTÉ One on 28 April 2020. The series stars Daisy Edgar-Jones as Marianne and Paul Mescal as Connell.

Themes 
Normal People has themes of love in a capitalist society and across class division. The main characters, Marianne and Connell, know each other from school but also because Connell's mother is a cleaner for Marianne's mother. This establishes the class divide in their relationship as Marianne comes from a bourgeois family whereas Connell's family is working-class.

Marianne and Connell have different views of their socioeconomic backgrounds. Connell feels that he is trapped in a cycle where the money he spends on Marianne comes from his mother who gets it from Marianne's family whereas Marianne seems unbothered by spending money. Connell lets the class divide come between them numerous times as he fears how he will be perceived. In school, Connell is popular and well liked by his classmates, unlike Marianne. This causes him to ask her to keep their relationship secret so that people do not find out his mom works for hers.

When the pair both attend Trinity College, the class division becomes more apparent. Marianne easily fits in with her upper-class classmates who come from similar backgrounds while those people look down on Connell for his lower socioeconomic status. As their relationship continues, their class background drives them apart. Marianne and Connell start to find friends and partners in their respective social classes. When Marianne starts to date Jamie in their second year at university, Connell feels out of place in her world because of his lack of wealth.

Socioeconomic class drives Marianne and Connell apart as they navigate early adulthood. Rooney uses these characters to explore how class divides keep people apart.

References

External links
Faber & Faber – Sally Rooney's profile

2018 Irish novels
Books by Sally Rooney
County Sligo in fiction
Faber and Faber books
Fiction set in 2011
Fiction set in 2012
Fiction set in 2013
Fiction set in 2014
Fiction set in 2015
Irish novels adapted into television shows
Novels set in Dublin (city)
Novels set in Ireland
Irish romance novels